Mark Elliott Fite is an American actor and comedian.

Career 
Fite is a founding member of the comedy group 2 Headed Dog with comedians Jim Turner, Dave Allen, and Craig Anton. He is known for creating roles and performing in comedy shows including The Tony Martini Variety Hour, Bob's Office Party, The Rudy Casoni Show, Girly Magazine Party, Clowntown City Limits, and Wife Swappers. Fite has worked with several theatre companies in Los Angeles, including The Actors' Gang, Theater of NOTE, and Padua Hills Playwrights' Festival where he worked with writers Murray Mednick, Leon Martell, Marlane Meyer, and John Steppling.

Fite has performed at multiple comedy venues and festivals around the country, as well as appearing at local L.A. favorites, Lucha VaVoom and Brookledge Follies.

In the 1990s, Fite had a prominent role as "Mark the Trasher" on the MTV game show Trashed, on which he destroyed the prized possessions of unlucky contestants. He has since appeared in television shows including SpongeBob SquarePants, Infinity Train, Agents of S.H.I.E.L.D, Scandal, Criminal Minds, Clash-A-Rama!, Parenthood, Grey's Anatomy, Rules of Engagement, The Naked Trucker and T-Bones Show, Friends, Seinfeld, and NewsRadio. Fite's varied film credits include Fight Club, Independence Day, Godzilla, Off the Lip, Elephant Sighs, The Adventures of Pinocchio, and in the short film for Dior (L.A.dy Dior) with Academy Award Winner Marion Cotillard, directed by John Cameron Mitchell.

In 2009, Fite performed in the comedy Matthew Modine Saves the Alpacas alongside Matthew Modine and French Stewart at the Geffen Playhouse in Los Angeles.

In 2016, Fite performed on stage with the Los Angeles Philharmonic at Walt Disney Concert Hall in La Mer, part of the L.A. Phil Symphonies For Youth Program.

Filmography

Film

Television

References

External links 
 

American male actors
American male comedians
21st-century American comedians
Year of birth missing (living people)
Living people